Trypogeus superbus is a species of beetle in the family Cerambycidae. It was described by Pic in 1922.

References

Dorcasominae
Beetles described in 1922